Juzeh (also Romanized as Jūzeh; also known as Jūreh) is a village in Chaqa Narges Rural District, Mahidasht District, Kermanshah County, Kermanshah Province, Iran. At the 2006 census, its population was 141, in 31 families.

References 

Populated places in Kermanshah County